Bloodsuckers (also known as Vampire Wars: Battle for the Universe) is a 2005 television film by Daniel Grodnik Productions directed by Matthew Hastings and produced by Gilles Laplante. The film stars Natassia Malthe and Dominic Zamprogna as the premier protagonists working as vampire hunters in space. The film had a mixed reception.

Premise
Intergalactic space vampire hunter. "Buffy the Vampire Slayer" meets "Star Trek" in a "Mad Max" world.

Cast
 Joe Lando as Churchill
 Dominic Zamprogna as Damian
 Natassia Malthe as Quintana
 Leanne Adachi as Rosa
 Aaron Pearl as Roman
Jake Kaese as Young Roman
 A. J. Cook as Fiona
 Michael DeLuise as Gilles
 Michael Ironside as Muco
 David Palffy as Phleg
 Elias Toufexis as Officer Brackish
 Carrie Ann Fleming as Damian's Wife
 Charisse Baker as Woman
 John DeSantis as Ble-Ka
 Geoff Redknap as Worm Host Creature
 Krista Bell as Roman's Mom
 Daniel Bacon as Vorhee Lieutenant Pu
 Steven McMichael as Vorhee #2
 Mike Desabrais as Vorhee #3
 Brett Armstrong as Dead IPC Officer
 Mike Carpenter as Giant Beast
 Peter DeLuise as Vondi, The German Space Tourist

Production
It was shot completely in Canada in the city of Vancouver and the province British Columbia.

Soundtrack 
The soundtrack was composed by Croatian Pop artist Davor Vulama.

Track list
 "I Know" by Max Serpentini
 "Ancient Daydream" by Malvado
 "Like You Promised" by Long John Baldry
 "Devil's Road" by King Karma
 "I Need You" by Vibrolux
 "I've Gone For A Ride" by Elevator To Hell
 "Q's Cue" by Suzka & McMillan
 "The Search" by El Mattador
 "The Clock Thickens" by Gyr8 featuring The Psychosis Twins
 "Lost" by Moneca Delain
 "Slave Ship" by The Darkest of the Hillside Thickets
 "Break Me Down" by James Murdoch
 "I'm Listening" by King Karma

Release
The film premiered on 8 May 2005 in France and was released in the US on the Sci-Fi Channel on 30 July 2005. It was released to DVD on 20 June 2006.

Reception 
Critical reception has been mixed. Dread Central criticized the film's vampires for not being "all that menacing or compelling" while also stating that "Bloodsuckers easily ranks one of the Sci-Fi Channels most entertaining original productions yet." DVD Talk shared similar sentiments, writing "Chock full of bad acting, ridiculously pulpy dialogue, and tons of sloppily satisfying gore, Vampire Wars is by all conceivable measures a pretty awful movie. But that doesn't mean I didn't have some fun with it!"

References

External links

Canadian horror television films
Canadian vampire films
2005 horror films
2000s science fiction horror films
Canadian science fiction horror films
2000s English-language films
Films shot in Vancouver
Space adventure films
2005 television films
2005 films
Syfy original films
Vampires in television
2000s American films
2000s Canadian films